Iivo is a predominantly Estonian, Finnish, and Karelian masculine given name. 

In both Finnish and Estonian, it is a cognate of Ivo. In Finnish, it is also often a shortened form of Iivari.

As of 1 January 2023, 27 men in Estonian bear the first name Iivo, making it the 1,292nd most popular male name in the country. In Finland, between the years 2020 and 2022, 379 men were shown to bear the name in the Population Information System. 	 

People named Iivo include:
Iivo Ahava (1896–1919), Karelian-Finnish military officer and Karelian nationalist
 (1882–1941), Karelian-Finnish writer, teacher and collector of Karelian folklore
Iivo Hokkanen (born 1985), Finnish ice hockey player
Iivo Nei (born 1931), Estonian chess master
Iivo Niskanen (born 1992), Finnish cross-country skier
Iivo Väänänen (1887–1959), Finnish sport shooter 
 (formerly Iivo Järvitalo; born 1971), Finnish ice hockey player and coach

References

Estonian masculine given names
Finnish masculine given names